The following is a list of cemeteries in Omaha, Douglas County, Nebraska in the United States.

The earliest cemetery in Omaha is the Mormon Pioneer Cemetery, established in 1846 for residents of Culter's Park.

Cemeteries

See also

 History of Omaha
 Jews and Judaism in Omaha
 Christians and Christianity in Omaha

External links
 Cemeteries in Douglas County

Cemeteries
Omaha